Julia is a 2008 international co-produced crime drama film, directed by Erick Zonca and starring Tilda Swinton. It was shot in California and Mexico. The film was inspired by the John Cassavetes film Gloria.<ref name="V1">{{cite magazine|url=https://www.variety.com/index.asp?layout=festivals&jump=review&id=2478&reviewid=VE1117936143&cs=1|title=Berlin review of Julia|last=Cockrell|first=Eddie|date=February 9, 2008|accessdate=March 20, 2009|magazine=Variety}}</ref>
For her performance, Tilda Swinton earned a nomination for César Award for Best Actress.

Plot
In California, an alcoholic named Julia (Tilda Swinton) is out of control, partying every night, and waking up in unknown homes with no memory of the previous night. Her reckless behavior costs her her job and she begins to go broke. She soon meets a mother, Elena (Kate del Castillo), at an AA meeting. Elena takes Julia into her apartment after finding her passed out on the pavement one night. The following morning Elena explains that she wants to kidnap her son Tom (Aidan Gould) from his wealthy grandfather and asks Julia to participate for $50,000. Julia declines, but after some time changes her mind. She visits an old friend to ask for his cooperation, but her offer is refused. She rides to the Mexican border, kidnaps the little boy and blackmails Elena's father-in-law for $2 million. The police discover her whereabouts and she flees, accidentally crashing her car through the wall dividing the United States and Mexico. There, the boy is kidnapped in turn by Mexican kidnappers. Her friend Mitch (Saul Rubinek) arrives in Mexico and gives Julia the ransom money. During the exchange, the Mexican kidnappers escape with the money, leaving the boy safely with Julia.

Cast
Tilda Swinton as Julia
Aidan Gould as Tom
Saul Rubinek as Mitch
Kate del Castillo as Elena
Jude Ciccolella as Nick
Bruno Bichir as Diego
Kevin Kilner as Johnny
Ezra Buzzington as George
Eugene Byrd as Leon
Horacio Garcia Rojas as Santos
John Bellucci as Phillip
Roger Cudney as Frank
Neko Parham as Ejay

Reception
The film premiered in February 2008 Berlin Film Festival and received very positive reviews in Germany as well as in other European countries. David Gordon Smith, writing for Der Spiegel, called it "one of the most stylish movies" in the competition and referred to Tilda Swinton as an "unforgettable leading lady." Markus Zinsmaier, in Die Zeit, said the film was one of the highpoints of the festival and had high praise for Swinton. Immediately after its success in Berlin, the movie was widely distributed in Germany. The film was praised in the French press also and was called a "French film with English dialogue." L'Humanité felt that the film ought to have won the competition and that Swinton should have won for best actress. The Dutch press praised the movie also. Kevin Toma of De Volkskrant called the movie "uncompromising," of "recalcitrant, dizzying beauty." Another Dutch reviewer, Constant Hoogenbosch of Moviemachine was less positive, stating the movie was too long, but in the end was saved by Swinton's performance.

A few U.S. reviewers disagreed with the generally positive European reviews. For example, Eddie Cockerell of Variety felt the scenes with Aidan Gould tied up and at gunpoint were "uncomfortably exploitative" and that Julia's redemption at the end of the film was "more convenient than emotionally earned," feeling that the film would not do well when brought to the U.S.

During an Cinemacy interview with director Randy Moore and co-star Elena Schuber when promoting Escape from Tomorrow, the lead actor Roy Abramsohn chose both Julia and Bernie as his favourite films during Ebertfest 2013, during his interview, in which Escape from Tomorrow'' also premiered.

Release
The film made its debut February 9, 2008 at the Berlin International Film Festival, and then was released for worldwide theatrical release: March 12, 2008 in France; May 7, 2008 in Belgium; June 19, 2008 in Germany; August 10, 2008 in India; August 14, 2008 in the Netherlands; August 21 in Kuwait. The film had a limited theatrical release in the United States on April 24, 2009 and was released on DVD on August 18, 2009.

References

External links

IONCINEMA.com Interview with Erick Zonca

2008 films
2008 crime drama films
2008 thriller drama films
2000s Spanish-language films
French crime drama films
French thriller drama films
Films about alcoholism
Films about child abduction in the United States
Girls with guns films
Films directed by Erick Zonca
English-language French films
English-language Mexican films
2000s French films